Acoustic in Concert  is the sixth live album by Scottish rock band Simple Minds, released in June 2017 in three different formats including a Blu-ray, DVD and double DVD-CD package.

Overview
On the eve of the Acoustic album release on 11 November 2016, Simple Minds took to the stage at London's Hackney Empire to perform a special show for the BBC's Radio 2 In Concert series. The show comprised acoustic versions of some of their greatest hits and best-loved tracks along with cover versions of some of the songs that shaped them. The Hackney Empire show was recorded and broadcast by the BBC in association with Eagle Vision to be released in its own right as Acoustic in Concert several months later (in June 2017) on CD, DVD and Blu-ray formats.

Release
The album release date in June 2017 was set to coincide with the UK leg of the Acoustic Live '17 tour (May–June 2017). Three formats carried the entire gig, including a Blu-ray, DVD and double DVD-CD package (the CD and the DVD are housed in a slimline jewel case with eight-page booklet).

Track listing
Source:

Personnel
Source:

Simple Minds
Jim Kerr – vocals
Charlie Burchill – guitar
Ged Grimes – bass and backing vocals
Gordy Goudie – guitar, harmonica and backing vocals
Cherisse Osei – percussion
Sarah Brown – backing vocals
Catherine Davies a.k.a. The Anchoress – backing vocals

Guests
Steve Harley – special guest

References

2017 live albums
Simple Minds live albums